Hasan Batuhan Artarslan (born 25 May 1994) is a Turkish professional footballer who plays as a midfielder for Erzurumspor.

Professional career
A long-time youth product at Trabzonspor, Batuhan spent his early career on loan in the Turkish lower divisions with 1461 Trabzon and Şanlıurfaspor. He formally joined the Trabzonspor senior team in the summer of 2017. Batuhan made his professional debut with Trabzonspor in a 3-1 Süper Lig win over Akhisar Belediyespor on 12 March 2018.

References

External links
 
 
 
 UEFA Profile

1994 births
People from Vakfıkebir
Living people
Turkish footballers
Turkey under-21 international footballers
Association football midfielders
Trabzonspor footballers
1461 Trabzon footballers
Şanlıurfaspor footballers
Büyükşehir Belediye Erzurumspor footballers
Ümraniyespor footballers
Süper Lig players
TFF First League players
TFF Second League players